"Save It Til Morning" is a song recorded by American singer Fergie for her second studio album, Double Dutchess (2017). It was written by Fergie and Toby Gad, who also produced the song. Fergie and Venus Brown provided additional vocal production on the song. "Save It Til Morning" was released to European markets as the fifth single from Double Dutchess on November 10, 2017.

Music video
The music video for "Save It Til Morning" was released on September 22, 2017, the same day as the album's release.

Promotion
Fergie performed "Save It Til Morning" live on The X Factor on November 19, 2017. According to Fergie, she finds songs like "Save It Til Morning" difficult to perform. On November 23, she visited Steve Wright in the Afternoon to promote the single.

Release history

References

2017 singles
2017 songs
Songs written by Fergie (singer)
Fergie (singer) songs
Songs written by Toby Gad
Song recordings produced by Toby Gad